Intense is the fifth studio album by Dutch DJ and record producer Armin van Buuren. It was released on 3 May 2013 by Armada Music.

The first song announced to be on the album is "Waiting for the Night", featuring the singer Fiora, which was released on 21 January 2013 as the theme song to the Dutch film Loving Ibiza (Verliefd op Ibiza). The second song announced to be on the album is "Forever is Ours", featuring the singer Emma Hewitt. The third song and first official single to be released is "This Is What It Feels Like", featuring the Canadian singer and songwriter Trevor Guthrie, was released on 5 April 2013. The accompanying music video, featuring Ron Jeremy, was released on 17 March 2013.

The album was first released exclusively on Spotify on 29 April 2013, followed by its official release on digital and physical media on 3 May 2013. An extended version of the album, called Intense (The More Intense Edition), was released on 12 November 2013. This album contains remixes from musicians such as John Ewbank, Andrew Rayel, W&W, Cosmic Gate, Tritonal, Ummet Ozcan and Ørjan Nilsen, along with radio edits, music videos, as well as two new songs from Armin van Buuren: "Save My Night" and "Don't Want to Fight Love Away" featuring Cindy Alma.

Composition
Armin van Buuren described genre composition of Intense as "more house-y electro stuff and of course trance, some rock influence, even a little bit of dubstep and classical music in there" during an interview with British DJ Pete Tong.

Track listing
All tracks produced by Armin van Buuren and Benno de Goeij. Except "Turn This Love Around" produced by Armin van Buuren, Olivia Nervo, Miriam Nervo and Benno de Goeij. Vocal production on "This Is What It Feels Like" by Jenson Vaughan.

Charts and certifications

Weekly charts

Year-end charts

Certifications

References

External links 
 Album Info on ArmadaMusic.com

2013 albums
Armin van Buuren albums
Armada Music albums